The Outlet Shoppes at Laredo is an outlet mall in downtown Laredo, Texas, featuring over 50 name-brand stores.

Both the I-35 exit and Mexico pedestrian bridge lead to the mall, located at 1600 Water Street.

History

The Outlet Shoppes at Laredo
On June 12, 2013, Horizon Group Properties and the City of Laredo announced the development of an outlet center in place of the River Drive Mall. The outlet mall feature 50+ outlet stores in a newly planned 3 level open air building. El Portal Center was demolished in 2014 for the new building. The Outlet Shoppes at Laredo opened in May 2017.

References

Shopping malls in Texas
Buildings and structures in Laredo, Texas